10th day is a 2012 Greek feature film in the mockumentary genre, created by the Greek director, writer and producer Vassilis Mazomenos. It was released in November 2013 in Athens.

Premise
The film refers to Ali, an Afghan Muslim, who lives in Athens, Greece. He is trying to get access to the western dream, surrounded by memories of his homeland, his trip to Europe and his «nightmares».

Cast
Ali Haidari as Ali
Ioli Demetriou as his Girlfriend
Mahdi Gorbani as Mahdi
Hosin Ahmadi as Abas
Nicos Arvanitis	as Man
Dina Avagianou	as Woman
Vassilis Koukalani as Driver

Festivals and awards
It was official selection in Montreal World Film Festival, Fantasporto and many other festivals. In 2014 "10th day" represented Greece in E.U Humans Rights Film Festival in Turkey.

Reviews
As Ninos Mikelides wrote: "Mazomenos records the route of his tragic hero through images selected with thought, images artistically wonderful, with lightings that clearly present the psychological state of the persons. The route of the Afghan immigrant gives the director the opportunity to present us cared and inspired pictures of the sad life of immigrants in our country, to conclude with the amazing, shocking images in the finale. Mazomenos managed with that to give us a strong film".

References

External links 
 http://vimeo.com/41280524
 http://www.filmfestivals.com/blog/fantasporto/10th_day_by_vasilis_mazomenos_at_fantasporto
 https://web.archive.org/web/20140525233742/http://www.unhcr.gr/1againstracism/en/lets-not-put-human-tragedy-to-second-place/
 http://tvxs.gr/news/sinema/oi-ellinikes-tainies-poy-ksexorisan-2013
 http://www.doctv.gr/page.aspx?itemID=SPG5585
 http://www.enet.gr/?i=news.el.article&id=406864
 http://10thday.wordpress.com/
 https://web.archive.org/web/20131205225253/http://diavasinet.gr/?p=2674
 http://www.londongreekfilmfestival.com/
 http://www.blowupfilmfest.com/#!/2015/nominees-narrative-feature.html
 http://flix.gr/en/10th-day-by-vasilis-mazomenos-at-the-montreal-worl.html
 https://web.archive.org/web/20121218161324/http://www.odyssey.gr/artsLiving/film/articles~2044~~article
 http://eu.greekreporter.com/2014/02/06/greek-films-at-berlin-international-film-festival/

Greek drama films
2012 films
2012 drama films
2010s mockumentary films
Greek nonlinear narrative films
Films about human rights
Films about immigration to Europe
Films about religion
2010s English-language films
English-language Greek films
Greek-language films
2010s avant-garde and experimental films
Greek avant-garde and experimental films
Films about time
Films set in Athens
Films shot in Greece